Panzerjäger (German "armour-hunters" or "anti-tank troop", abbreviated to Pz.Jg. in German) was a branch of service of the German Wehrmacht during the Second World War. It was an anti-tank arm-of-service that operated self-propelled anti-tank artillery, also named Panzerjäger. Soldiers assigned to tank hunting units wore ordinary field-gray uniforms rather than the black of the Panzer troops, while Panzerjäger vehicle crews wore the Panzer jacket in field gray.

Development
From 1940, the Panzerjäger troops were equipped with vehicles produced by mounting an existing anti-tank gun complete with the gun shield on a tracked chassis to allow higher mobility.

The development of Panzerjägers into the fully protected Jagdpanzer armored vehicle designs began before the war with the Sturmgeschütz-designated armored artillery vehicles, the initial German turretless tanks to use completely closed-in armored casemates, and continued until 1944, resulting in the fully enclosed Jagdpanzer "hunting tanks", purpose-built heavy-gun tank destroyers. These usually used upward extensions of both the glacis plate and hull sides to comprise three sides of their closed-in casemates. Panzerjäger continued to serve as a separate branch of the Heer until the end of the war, often replacing tanks due to production shortages.

Initially, the chassis of captured light tanks were used after turrets were removed, providing a cost-effective solution to the German shortage of mobile anti-tank weapons in infantry divisions. Despite the shortcomings of light armour and high silhouette, they were successfully used in their intended role of a self-propelled anti-tank gun. Neither anti-tank guns nor Panzerjägers had any real armor to speak of, and while the Panzerjäger had a higher silhouette and was more visible than an anti-tank gun, it was also much more mobile, and was able to relocate or retreat far more rapidly than conventional anti-tank gun crews. The lack of armor meant little until the self-propelled guns began to take on more and more of the offensive duties of tanks as the war progressed and production lagged.

Organisation
From 1943, the Type 44 infantry divisions included the following divisional Panzerjäger-Abteilung ('tank hunter battalion'):

 Staff company (Stabskompanie)
 1. Panzerjäger-Kompanie equipped with 9-12 towed Anti-tank guns
 2. Sturmgestchütz-Batterie equipped with ten fully-casemated StuG III, StuG IV assault guns or Hetzer vehicles
 3. Light anti-aircraft company (leichte FlaK-Kompanie) equipped with 12 towed 20 mm FlaK autocannon

Combat use
Panzerjäger units were either assigned as the 14th companies in infantry regiments, or as a whole Abteilung (battalion) within Panzer and Panzergrenadier divisions, in both the Waffen-SS and the Heer, the (regular army). Independent battalions and regiments were used by corps to protect the most likely avenues of tank attacks, while divisions would often position their Panzerjäger on the flanks, or use them to support infantry advances against an enemy using tanks. When used with tanks, despite intense inter-branch rivalry, Panzerjäger would work in teams, with the tank crews enticing enemy tanks to fire, disclosing their position, and Panzerjäger engaging the enemy from a defilade. Panzerjäger were often called upon to provide direct high explosive supporting fire to infantry by destroying machine gun and artillery positions, particularly in urban fighting.

Vehicle designs
Designs of the Panzerjäger vehicles varied based on the chassis used, which could be of three types:
 Early war open-topped superstructure on a light tank chassis
 Mid-war fully enclosed crew compartment on a medium or heavy tank chassis, as an added-on entity not usually integral to the original hull armor 
 Late war unarmoured or shielded mounting on a half-track chassis

Notable tank destroyers in the Panzerjäger classification were:
Panzerjäger I – Czech 4,7cm KPÚV vz. 38 (47 mm PaK) on Panzer I chassis.
4,7 cm Pak (t) auf Panzerjäger Renault R35(f) - 47 mm on Renault R35
Marder I – 75 mm PaK on captured French chassis, the Lorraine 37L.
Marder II – 75 mm PaK or reused Soviet 76.2 mm gun on Panzer II chassis.
Marder III – 75 mm PaK or reused Soviet 76.2 mm gun on Czech-built Panzer 38(t) chassis.
10.5 cm K gepanzerte Selbstfahrlafette '''Dicker Max' – two prototype as self-propelled bunker buster on Panzer IV chassis tested as anti-tank weapon.
Sturer Emil – 12.8 cm Selbstfahrlafette auf VK 30.01(H), reuse of  two prototype heavy tank chassis as experimental self-propelled gun.
Hornisse/Nashorn – 88 mm PaK on composite Panzer III/Panzer IV chassis.Ferdinand/Elefant – the last Panzerjäger vehicle so designated, incorporating a fully enclosed, casemate added to rejected Tiger I chassis design.

The later Jagdpanzer designation was used from the beginning for the following more integrally armored vehicles:Jagdpanzer 38(t)  JagdpantherJagdpanzer IVJagdtigerSee also
Archer - a British self-propelled anti-tank gun.
M56 Scorpion - a US self-propelled gun

Notes

ReferencesPanzerjäger Brechen Durch! (Tanks Break Through!)'' by Alfred-Ingemar Berndt, an eye-witness account of the battles that led to the fall of France. 

World War II tank destroyers of Germany